Kay Lohrasp was a legendary Iranian king who ruled Iran after Kay Khosrow. He had two brave sons Vishtaspa (also known as Gushtasp) and the younger Zarir. Vishtaspa ruled Iran after his father. One of Kay Lohrasp most notable works is the construction of  Fire temple that has never It had no record until then.

Lohrasp in the Shahnameh
Lohrasp was not really the king of Iran; he ruled only part of Iran and was the head of his great tribes. The land he occupied is called Arzan or Arzāniān, and his whereabouts are still unknown. In fact, his son Goshtāsep and his grandson Esfandiyār are very famous. The character of the Lohraspian dynasty is God-worshiping, and it was by his son that the Zoroastrian religion was adopted in Iran.

Lohrasp was involved in the Kay Khosrow  war but was not very famous. Zāl in his argument describes a weak and powerless person. Kay Khosrow was great during the war, but after all his victories, he broke once and closed all the doors of the palace and worshiped all the time. Shahnameh reports that Kay Khosrow chose Lohrasp  but is not very trusted. Lohrasp is the other land and is very far from the Kay Khosrow . In the reign, Lohrasp only quarreled with his son Gushtasp, and Gushtasp intended to take his father's place, but the father would not allow it. Finally, Gushtasp goes to Rûm.

period of time

Gallery

See also
 Luarsab (given name)

References

Sources
Ferdowsi Shahnameh. From the Moscow version. Mohammed Publishing. 
 Brief History of the Earth p.10-12
 Lohrasp and Nebuchadrezzar, archived version

External links

Kayanians
Shahnameh characters
Shahnameh stories